John Russell Dilworth (born February 14, 1963) is an American animator, actor, writer, director, storyboard artist, producer and the creator of the animated television series Courage the Cowardly Dog. His work has mainly appeared on PBS, CBS, Showtime, HBO, Fox, ABC, NBC, Arte, CBC Television, YTV, Teletoon, BBC Two, Cartoon Network, Nickelodeon, Comedy Central and MTV, among others.

Career 
After graduation, Dilworth became an art director at Baldi, Bloom and Whelan Advertising, but continued to work on his own films in his spare time, providing much of his own funding. His animated short, The Chicken from Outer Space, was nominated for an Academy Award in 1996. Cartoon Network later commissioned Dilworth to turn the short into a series, which eventually became Courage the Cowardly Dog. Dilworth is the president of Stretch Films, a New York-based design and animation studio, which he founded in 1991. He also worked on the original opening for Nicktoons and for shows such as Doug, Rugrats, and My Life as a Teenage Robot, as well as the Disney animated series PB&J Otter. Dilworth created the series of nine animated shorts for Sesame Street based on his independent film, "Noodles & Nedd". "Nedd" is named after the author Nedd Willard, a mentor.

Dilworth's short Angry Cabaret was also featured in MTV's 1994 Animation Weekend. His breakout film was The Dirdy Birdy, which aired on MTV's Cartoon Sushi and on Comedy Central. He was animation consultant of Gumby: The Movie, and was also one of the directors of Drew Carey's Green Screen Show.

Dilworth appears in pixilation sequences in the 2013 animated short Subconscious Password by Chris Landreth.

In 2017, Dilworth completed his latest animation, Goose in High Heels. The 22-minute animated short could be previously be viewed on his YouTube channel, Stretch Films; however, it currently is not available online for viewing.

Stretch Films 

Stretch Films, Inc. is a production company that was founded in 1991 by John R. Dilworth. It is best known for Courage the Cowardly Dog on Cartoon Network as well as the many short films screened all over the world.

Filmography 
 Pierre (1985) (student film; appeared on Showtime)
 The Limited Bird  (1989; aired on Fox)
 Earthday Birthday (1990)
 When Lilly Laney Moved In (1991; aired on the American Broadcasting Company)
 Psyched For Snuppa (1992) (Jumbo Pictures for Nickelodeon)
 Smart Talk with Raisin (1993) (Appeared on MTV's Liquid Television in 1994)
 The Dirdy Birdy (1994) (Redux aired in 2014)
 Angry Cabaret (1994) (Also appeared on MTV Animation Weekend)
 Cartoon Network (ID's) (1994–1997)
 The Chicken from Outer Space  (1996) Academy Award nominated short
 Noodles and Nedd (1996) (later appeared on Sesame Street)
 Big Bag: Ace and Avery (1998)
 Hector The Get-Over Cat (1998) – Indent for Nickelodeon.
 A Little Curious (short films) (1999)
 Courage the Cowardly Dog (series) (1999–2002)
 Catch Of The Day (featuring Noodles and Nedd) (2000)
 Courage in Scary Monsters (2000; Web Premiere Toons short)
 The Mousochist (2001)
 Life In Transition (2005)
 The Return of Sergeant Pecker (2006, credited as Pierre Delarue)
 Garlic Boy (2008)
 Rinky Dink (2009)
 Bunny Bashing (2011)
 Pumpkin Reports (2012) – CGI pilot episode made by Spanish studio Motion Pictures, S.A., that hired John to direct the pilot. In 2016, was turned in a TV series.
 The Fog of Courage (2014) – A special CGI short starring Courage the Cowardly Dog.
 The Dirdy Birdy Redux (2014)
 Dirdy Birdy II: A Night at Club Sheik (2015) – A cancelled sequel to The Dirdy Birdy.
 Prudence and the Imps (2016) – An unfinished animated pilot
 Goose in High Heels (2017)
 Mom got eaten by a Spider Demon (2017)
 Howl if You Love Me (TBA)

References

External links 

 StretchFilms.com, Homepage of Dilworth's Animation Company
 

Animators from New York (state)
American cartoonists
American animated film directors
American animated film producers
Hanna-Barbera people
1963 births
Living people
School of Visual Arts alumni
Artists from New York City
20th-century American artists
21st-century American artists
Annie Award winners
Cartoon Network Studios people